Evans Sarfo is a Ghanaian professional footballer who plays as a midfielder for Ghanaian Premier League side Karela United.

Club career 
Sarfo previously played for Asokwa Deportivo SC in the Ghana Division One League before moving to Western Region-based club Karela United. In November 2020, Asokwa Deportivo announced that Sarfo had been transferred to Premier league side Karela United for an undisclosed amount. He made his debut after being named on the starting line up for the first match of the season on 15 November 2020 in a 2–2 draw against Ashanti Gold.

International career 
Sarfo was called up to the Ghana national under-20 football team ahead of the 2020 WAFU Zone B U-20 Tournament. Ghana won the tournament and qualified for the 2021 Africa U-20 Cup of Nations, which unfortunately he was not given a call up.

References

External links 
 

Living people
Association football midfielders
Ghanaian footballers
Ghana youth international footballers
Ghana Premier League players
Karela United FC players
Year of birth missing (living people)